Patrick Cleveland Reynolds (born December 2, 1948) is an American anti-smoking activist and former actor.

Born in Miami Beach, Florida, he is the grandson of the tobacco company founder, R. J. Reynolds, and speaks of how he believes his family business has killed millions, including his own father, R. J. Reynolds Jr., and half brother, R. J. Reynolds III.  He is a frequent speaker on the dangers of smoking, and founded a non-profit organization dedicated to anti-tobacco campaigning.

Social activism

In April 1986, Reynolds went with a friend to a meeting with Senator Robert Packwood, where the issue of a proposed cut in tobacco tax was raised. Outraged, Reynolds stood up and asked why US tobacco taxes were so low. By June 1986, Reynolds had become an anti-smoking activist, appearing in adverts for the American Lung Association and testifying before a congressional subcommittee at the invitation of Packwood, to the dismay of his family. He had already sold his tobacco stock in 1979, and tried to get hired by RJR Nabisco Inc. from 1983–85, in an attempt to get the company to divest their tobacco holding. Reynolds was himself a smoker for 17 years until he quit in 1985 after over 10 years of trying. He has appeared on many national television programs.

In 1989, Reynolds founded The Foundation for a Smokefree America. That same year, Reynolds published The Gilded Leaf with Thomas Shachtman, chronicling three generations of his family and its tobacco business, a book he had been working on since 1980. The book was re-issued in 2006. In 2007 he released an educational video on DVD of a tobacco prevention talk he gave titled The Truth About Tobacco.

Former Surgeon General, C. Everett Koop M.D., called him "one of the nation's most influential advocates of a smokefree America." He continues to speak on tobacco control to adult groups, and also gives motivational prevention talks before high school and elementary school audiences. He advised the Greek government on anti-smoking measures in 2009, and in 2011 was seeking sponsorship for a world tour.

Relative to the friction within his family over his public campaign, he said in 2011 it has eased. "[S]ince 1986, the price of the stock kept going up. And as far as being an embarrassment, I received an award from the World Health Organization; I brought honor to the Reynolds family."

Personal life
His mother was his father's second wife, actress Marianne O'Brien who appeared in the 1940s in films like The Very Thought of You, contracted to Jack L. Warner. His parents separated when he was three and he did not meet his father again until he was nine. His father died five years later from emphysema aged 64, leaving a will that disinherited Patrick and his brother and four half-brothers. He received $500,000 from his father's fourth wife in agreement not to contest the will. He inherited $2.5 million from his grandfather in 1969, when he was 21.

Having attended The Hotchkiss School, Reynolds studied filmmaking at the University of California and the University of Southern California. He ventured into acting in 1975, during a visit to the set of Nashville. His live-in girlfriend, actress Shelley Duvall, had invited him to the set, and director Robert Altman cast him in a small non-speaking role. Reynolds subsequently studied acting at several Los Angeles schools; with Milton Katselas, classmates included Michelle Pfeiffer and Patrick Swayze. At the urging of his voice coach, he recorded three unreleased pop singles in 1982. He married his first wife Regina Wahl in Ofterschwang, West Germany in July 1983, quit acting and briefly began working for her father's international bus company. He returned to acting after being offered a lead role in Eliminators. His mother died in 1985. In 1986, he spoke out publicly for the first time against the tobacco industry. He remarried in 2007, and lives in Los Angeles with his wife Alexandra and their son, born in October 2009.

Partial filmography
Civil Wars
Santa Barbara (TV series)
Pumping Iron
All My Children
Eliminators (1986)
Bernice Bobs Her Hair PBS Adaptation of F. Scott Fitzgerald's short story
A Rose for Emily PBS Adaptation of William Faulkner's short story
Olivia Newton-John Physical (Olivia Newton-John song) music video

References

External links 

 
 

1948 births
Living people
People from Miami Beach, Florida
Hotchkiss School alumni
American motivational speakers
American motivational writers
American male film actors
American male television actors
American male soap opera actors
Anti-smoking activists
Reynolds family
American health activists
20th-century American male actors